The following lists events that happened in 1991 in Libya.

Incumbents
President: Muammar al-Gaddafi
 Prime Minister: Abuzed Omar Dorda

Events

November
 November 13 - The United Kingdom and the United States charge two Libyan men with the Pan Am Flight 103 bombing.
 November 27 - The US, UK and France call on the Libyan government to surrender the suspects for trial.

Births
 23 April - Rabea Al Laafi.
 7 November - Nuri Ja'far,  Iraqi psychologist and philosopher of education.

Deaths
 25 February - Suleiman Ali Nashnush.

Sport
 1991–92 Libyan Premier League

References

 
Years of the 20th century in Libya
Libya
Libya
1990s in Libya